Kupiuka is a genus of spiders in the family Salticidae. It was first described in 2010 by Ruiz. , it contains 8 species, all of which live in Brazil.

Species
Kupiuka comprises the following species:
Kupiuka adisi Ruiz, 2010
Kupiuka extratheca Ruiz, 2010
Kupiuka heteropicta Ruiz, 2010
Kupiuka murici Ruiz, 2010
Kupiuka overalli Ruiz, 2010
Kupiuka paulista Ruiz, 2010
Kupiuka taruman Ruiz, 2010
Kupiuka vochysiae Ruiz, 2010

References

Salticidae
Salticidae genera
Spiders of Brazil